Ion Prodan may refer to:
 Ion Prodan (footballer)
 Ion Prodan (serial killer)